Swaffham Rural District was a rural district in Norfolk, England from 1894 to 1974.

It was formed under the Local Government Act 1894 based on the Swaffham rural sanitary district.  It almost completely encircled Swaffham Urban District.

In 1935 it took in a small part of Downham Rural District to complete the encirclement of urban Swaffham. It also took in the central section of the disbanded Thetford Rural District.

In 1974, the district was abolished under the Local Government Act 1972, and became part of the Breckland district.

Statistics

Parishes

References

Districts of England created by the Local Government Act 1894
Districts of England abolished by the Local Government Act 1972
Historical districts of Norfolk
Rural districts of England